Susan Neville (born January 4, 1951 Indianapolis, Indiana) is a short story writer, essayist and professor, known for her work exploring Indiana and the Midwest.

Life 

She graduated from DePauw University in 1973.
In 1976, she graduated from Bowling Green State University with an M.F.A.  She taught at St. Petersburg Junior College, Ball State University, and Indiana University East.  She teaches at Butler University and the Warren Wilson Program for Writers in North Caroline.

She lives in Indianapolis, Indiana.

Awards 

 Two National Endowment for the Arts Fellowships
 Richard Sullivan prize for In the House of Blue Lights
 1984 Flannery O'Connor Award for Short Fiction for The Invention of Flight
 Winner of the 2019 Catherine Doctorow Prize for Innovative Fiction from Fiction Collective 2 for The Town of Whispering Dolls

Works

Short Story Collections

Nonfiction

Essays & stories online

Notes

References 

 
 

1951 births
DePauw University alumni
Bowling Green State University alumni
Ball State University faculty
Butler University faculty
Living people